Svadbarsko (Свадбарско) or Wedding dance in English is a Macedonian oro from the region of Veles.

It is a man dance with steady ad peaceful movements on whole feet. The dancers are holding shoulders and begin their dance in a position of a half circle. The dance rhythm is 2/4.

See also
Music of North Macedonia

Further reading
Dimovski, Mihailo. (1977:44-5). Macedonian folk dances (Original in Macedonian: Македонски народни ора). Skopje: Naša kniga & Institut za folklor

Macedonian dances